The 2021–22 San Jose State Spartans men's basketball team represented San Jose State University in the 2021–22 NCAA Division I men's basketball season. They were led by first-year head coach Tim Miles and played their games at Provident Credit Union Event Center as members of the Mountain West Conference. They finished the season 8–23, 1–17 in MWC play to finish in last place. They lost to Fresno State in the first round of the MWC tournament.

Previous season 
In a season limited due to the ongoing COVID-19 pandemic, the Spartans finished the 2020–21 season 7–24, 3–15 in Mountain West play to finish in 10th place. They lost in the first round of the Mountain West tournament to New Mexico.

On March 12, 2021, the school fired head coach Jean Prioleau after four seasons with a 20–93 overall record. The school announced the hire of former Nebraska head coach Tim Miles as their next head coach on April 6.

Offseason

Departures

Incoming transfers

2021 recruiting class

Roster

Schedule and Results

|-
!colspan=9 style=| Exhibition

|-
!colspan=9 style=| Non-conference regular season

|-
!colspan=9 style=| Mountain West regular season

|-
!colspan=9 style=| Mountain West tournament

Source

References

San Jose State Spartans men's basketball seasons
San Jose State
San Jose State
San Jose State